De Apostle is a roots reggae, dance hall artist hailing from St. Croix, U.S. Virgin Islands.  He started performing at the age of six in school talent shows and started professionally in the music industry at the age of thirteen.  His music is in the tradition of the reggae music of St. Croix, Virgin Islands, which has a distinct "roots" feeling and is strongly rooted in Rastafari.

History
Neal Isaiah Daniel a.k.a. De Apostle's first album Genesis was released in early 2001.  To follow would be numerous albums and songs culminating with The King Of The VI, which was submitted for nomination in 2009 for the 52nd Annual Grammy Awards 2010 in the category Best Reggae Album. 
He has collaborated with numerous artists such as multi-platinum recording artist Juvenile.  Also, Sizzla, Morgan Heritage, Luciano, Turbulence, Pressure Buss Pipe, and Ishi Dube.

Releases
 Genesis
 Book of Fire
 Renegade Music
 Xtreme-All or Nothing
 Island Heat Vol.1, Vol.2, Vol.3
 The Ultimate Collection
 Armed & Danerous
 King of the V.I.
 Fight, Pray, Love
 My Heart's Coldest Winter
 Armed & dangerous vol 2
 Razor Blade Autobiography
 The heart burns a thousand fires

References

External links
 https://web.archive.org/web/20121002015049/http://www.reggaepromotions.net/post?id=3728388
 http://projectgroundation.com/artists/de-apostle/
 https://web.archive.org/web/20100110023931/http://www.coremagazine.vi/magazine/apostle.html
 http://www.vireggae.com/albums.htm

American reggae musicians
People from Saint Croix, U.S. Virgin Islands
Living people
Dancehall musicians
Reggae fusion artists
Performers of Rastafarian music
Year of birth missing (living people)